Miklós Dudás OSBM (27 October 1902 – 15 July 1972) was a Hungarian Greek Catholic hierarch. He was bishop of the Hungarian Greek Catholic Eparchy of Hajdúdorog from 1939 to 1972, Apostolic Administrator of the Ruthenian Catholic Eparchy of Mukacheve from 1943 to 1946 and Apostolic Administrator of Apostolic Exarchate of Miskolc from 1946 to 1972.

Life
Born in Máriapócs, Austria-Hungary in 1902, he was ordained a priest on 8 September 1927. He was appointed a bishop by the Holy See on 25 March 1939. He was consecrated to the Episcopate on 14 May 1939. The principal consecrator was Antal Papp, and the principal co-consecrators were Endré Kriston and Zoltán Lajos Meszlényi.

He died in Nyíregyháza on 15 July 1972.

See also
Catholic Church in Hungary

References 

1902 births
1972 deaths
20th-century Eastern Catholic bishops
Hungarian Eastern Catholics
Hungarian bishops
People from Máriapócs
Order of Saint Basil the Great
Collegium Germanicum et Hungaricum alumni
Bishops of the Hungarian Greek Catholic Church